"Mrs. Brown, You've Got a Lovely Daughter" is a popular song written by British actor, screenwriter and songwriter Trevor Peacock. It was originally sung by actor Tom Courtenay in The Lads, a British TV play of 1963, and released as a single on UK Decca.

The best-known version of the song is by Herman's Hermits, who took it to number one on the US Billboard Hot 100 in May 1965, and number one in Canada the month before. The single debuted on the Hot 100 at number twelve—the third highest debut of the decade (after the Beatles' "Hey Jude" and "Get Back", which both debuted at number ten). The Hermits never released the track—or their other US 1965 number one, "I'm Henry VIII, I Am"—as a single in their native Britain. As "Mrs. Brown" was released only a few weeks after the band's previous single, "Silhouettes", both songs ended up occupying the top 10 simultaneously, with "Silhouettes" peaking at number five.

"Mrs Brown, You've Got a Lovely Daughter" was recorded as an afterthought in two takes and featured unique muted lead and rhythm guitar by Derek Leckenby and Keith Hopwood and heavily accented lead vocals by Peter Noone, with backing vocals from Karl Green and Keith Hopwood. The band never dreamed it would be a single let alone hit number one in the US. According to Noone the song was well known to British bands; it would often be performed at birthday parties, substituting the surname of the girl whose party was being celebrated, i.e., "Mrs. Smith" or "Mrs. Jones" instead of "Mrs. Brown".

Alvin and the Chipmunks covered the song for their 1965 album Chipmunks à Go-Go.

An answer to the song, titled, "Mrs. Jones, Your Son Gives Up Too Easy," was released on the Recording Industries (RIC) label as a single in 1965, performed by a group named Lynn and the Mersey Maids.

The song was released in Japan on Odeon Records, a subsidiary of Toshiba, as OR-1272. It was backed by the song "Wonderful World".

It was recorded by Nellie McKay for her 2015 album My Weekly Reader.

References

1965 singles
Herman's Hermits songs
Song recordings produced by Mickie Most
Billboard Hot 100 number-one singles
Cashbox number-one singles
RPM Top Singles number-one singles
Number-one singles in South Africa
1963 songs
MGM Records singles
Films shot in Greater Manchester